Mohammadabad-e Qaleh Shahid (also Romanized as Moḩammadābād-e Qal‘eh Shahīd) is a village in Posht Rud Rural District, in the Central District of Narmashir County, Kerman Province, Iran. At the 2006 census, its population was 55, in 13 families.

References 

Populated places in Narmashir County